Creve Coeur  is a city located in mid St. Louis County, Missouri, United States, a part of Greater St. Louis. Its population was 18,834 at the 2020 census. Creve Coeur borders and shares a ZIP code (63141) with the neighboring city of Town and Country. It is home to the headquarters of Drury Hotels, and Monsanto until its acquisition by Bayer in 2018.

History
The name crève cœur ("heartbreak") is said to derive from Creve Coeur Lake. According to the city's website, the tale goes that the lake "formed itself into a broken heart" after an Indian princess's unrequited love for a French fur trapper led her to jump "from a ledge overlooking" the lake.

Written accounts and archaeological finds show that Native Americans inhabited the Creve Coeur area from 9500 BC to 1800 AD. French explorers began farming and fishing in the area in the early 18th century, and fur trappers settled there in the early 19th century. When the area was acquired by the United States through the Louisiana Purchase in 1803, the Lewis and Clark Expedition came through Creve Coeur. During the American Civil War, men from the area served on both sides of the conflict, but most residents were southern sympathizers.

Creve Coeur was incorporated in 1949. Although cabins more than 200 years old (including two still in Conway Park) are in the community, it grew primarily as a stopping point along Olive Boulevard (now Route 340) between University City and Creve Coeur Lake. It expanded faster following construction of Interstate 270 and U.S. Route 40.

The lake and its associated park of the same name, which was the first county park in St. Louis County, is now part of Maryland Heights to the north of Creve Coeur.

Geography
Creve Coeur is located at  (38.667352, -90.442600).

Government
The City of Creve Coeur's Charter was adopted in 1976, providing for a council-city administrator form of government. The mayor is elected by the voters while the city council consists of eight members (two members representing each of four wards, council members are elected to serve staggered two-year terms). The mayor is elected at large for a three-year term. The city administrator is hired by the city council and is responsible for the day-to-day operations of the city.
Creve Coeur has 104 government employees.

The city is located in the 2nd Congressional District, 7th and 24th State Senate District, and 82nd and 87th State Representative Districts.

Ratings and accreditations
The City of Creve Coeur's Standard & Poor bond rating is AAA, one of only four such rated cities in Missouri. 

The city's police department is accredited through the Commission on Accreditation for Law Enforcement Agencies.

Demographics

Ranked third in highest assessed value in St. Louis County the median income for a household in the city was $94,852, and the median income for a family was $99,100. Males had a median income of $65,106 versus $39,102 for females. The per capita income for the city was $59,496. About 1.8% of families and 2.9% of the population were below the poverty line, including 1.8% of those under age 18 and 2.7% of those age 65 or over.

2020 census
As of the 2020 census, 18,834 people and 8,340 households were living in the city. The racial makeup of the city was 71.2% White, 9.1% African American, 0.2% Native American, 12.5% Asian, 1.4% from other races, and 5.6% from two or more races. Hispanics or Latinos of any race were 3.5% of the population.

2010 census
As of the census of 2010,  17,833 people, 7,654 households, and 4,717 families were living in the city. The racial makeup of the city was 79.9% White, 7.2% African American, 0.2% Native American, 10.1% Asian, 0.7% from other races, and 1.9% from two or more races. Hispanics or Latinos of any race were 2.6% of the population.

Of the 7,654 households, 26.0% had children under 18 living with them, 53.2% were married couples living together, 6.2% had a female householder with no husband present, 2.2% had a male householder with no wife present, and 38.4% were not families. About 32.8% of all households were made up of individuals, and 12.4% had someone living alone who was 65 or older. The average household size was 2.26,and the average family size was 2.91.

The median age in the city was 44.3 years; 20.9% of residents were under 18; 7.4% were between 18 and 24; 22.6% were from 25 to 44; 28.5% were from 45 to 64; and 20.7% were 65 or older. The gender makeup of the city was 48.2% male and 51.8% female.

2000 census
As of the census of 2000, 16,500 people, 6,988 households, and 4,465 families were living in the city. The population density was 1,628.9 people/sq mi (628.9/km2). The 7,496 housing units had an average density of 740.0/sq mi (285.7/km2). The racial makeup of the city was 88.79% White, 3.45% African American, 0.21% Native American, 6.02% Asian, 0.56% from other races, and 0.97% from two or more races. Hispanics or Latinos of any race were 1.77% of the population.

Of the 6,988 households,  25.6% had children under 18 living with them, 57.6% were married couples living together, 4.6% had a female householder with no husband present, and 36.1% were not families. About 30.9% of all households were made up of individuals, and 10.8% had someone living alone who was 65 or older. The average household size was 2.29, and the average family size was 2.89.

In the city, the age distribution was 21.0% under 18, 6.9% from 18 to 24, 25.0% from 25 to 44, 27.9% from 45 to 64, and 19.2% who were 65 or older. The median age was 43 years. For every 100 females, there were 93.2 males. For every 100 females age 18 and over, there were 91.5 males.

Education
About 68% of Creve Coeur residents have college degrees; 33% have graduate or professional degrees.

Primary and secondary schools
The western portion of Creve Coeur is part of the public Parkway School District. The eastern portion is served by the Ladue School District. Pattonville School District covers a northeast portion of the city limits of Creve Coeur. Public schools in Creve Coeur include Ladue Schools West Campus, Spoede Elementary School (Ladue Schools), Bellerive Elementary School (Parkway District), and Northeast Middle School (Parkway District).

Creve Coeur has a number of parochial elementary and middle schools including Our Lady of the Pillar, Saul Mirowitz Jewish Community School (formerly Solomon Schechter Day School), and St. Monica; and four private high schools (Saint Louis Priory School, De Smet Jesuit, Chaminade College Preparatory School, and Whitfield School). Roman Catholic schools are of the Roman Catholic Archdiocese of St. Louis.

Colleges and universities
Missouri Baptist University is located within the city of Creve Coeur along with Covenant Theological Seminary.

Health care
Health-care facilities in Creve Coeur include Barnes-Jewish West County Hospital, which is home to a satellite facility of the Alvin J. Siteman Cancer Center. Creve Coeur also contains Mercy Hospital St. Louis.

Economy
Creve Coeur is recognized as a key node for technology, life and bio sciences, and medical services in the St. Louis region. It is home to Bayer, the Donald Danforth Plant Science Center & the Bio Research and Development Growth Park, all located in the 39 North Agtech Innovation District.

Isle of Capri Casinos moved its headquarters to Creve Coeur from Biloxi, Mississippi, in 2006. The state of Missouri and the city of Creve Coeur had offered Isle of Capri more than $4.2 million in tax incentives. In addition, Correctional Medical Services, Drury Hotels, have their headquarters in Creve Coeur.

Adam's Mark previously had its headquarters in the city.

Top 10 employers
According to the city's 2011 Comprehensive Annual Financial the top employers in the city are:

Notable businesses
According to St. Louis Business Journal Book of Lists 2012, Creve Coeur is home to several leading businesses in the St. Louis region.

Technology
Five of the top 15 largest information technology consulting firms in St. Louis are located in Creve Coeur, including the top two:
TEKsystems, Computer Sciences, Daugherty Business Solutions, Volt Workforce Solutions, Bradford & Galt, Envision, and iBridge Solutions

Life and plant sciences
Two of the top 10 largest life science research organizations in St. Louis are located in Creve Coeur:
Bayer and Donald Danforth Plant Science Center

Organizations
The American Association of Orthodontists has its headquarters in the city.

Attractions
The City of Creve Coeur maintains six parks with amenities including playgrounds, walking trails, tennis courts, and athletic fields. The City of Creve Coeur also operates the Dielmann Recreation Complex, which includes a 9-hole golf course and ice arena. Creve Coeur Lake Memorial Park is a St. Louis County Park located 3 miles north of the City of Creve Coeur.

Transportation
Lambert–St. Louis International Airport (STL) is 11 miles away.

Notable people
 Spencer Boyd, NASCAR driver
 Bradley Beal, NBA player for the Washington Wizards
 Michael S. Engel, (born 1971), paleontologist and entomologist
Jon Hamm, actor
Jeff Irwin, musician and multi-instrumentalist
Yadier Molina, MLB player for the St. Louis Cardinals
Sklar Brothers, comedians and actors
Jayson Tatum, NBA player for the Boston Celtics
Vladimir Tarasenko, NHL player for the St. Louis Blues

References

External links

 City of Creve Coeur official website

Cities in St. Louis County, Missouri
French colonial settlements of Upper Louisiana
Cities in Missouri